El Calvario is a town and municipality in the Meta Department, Colombia. It was the epicenter of the 2008 Colombia earthquake.

Climate
El Calvario has a borderline subtropical highland climate (Köppen Cfb)/tropical rainforest climate (Af) with mild mornings, warm afternoons and heavy to very heavy rainfall year-round.

References

Municipalities of Meta Department